MILS may refer to:

 Multiple Independent Levels of Security, a high-assurance computer security architectural concept
  or "Interministerial Mission in the Fight Against Cults", a French government agency